Golf Zero is a 2017 platform golfing game developed by Colin Lane Games AB.

Gameplay 
The game tasks the player with avoiding hazards, jumping across chasms and staying alive like any platformer. However, the player has to golf a ball into the hole at the end of the level to complete it (instead of making it to the end alive). Balloons are also present in some levels, which need to be popped with a golf ball to receive the Gold Medal. Some levels also need to be completed within a time limit to receive the Gold Medal.  The player is given three shots to get one ball into the hole.

Reception 

Golf Zero received mostly positive reviews. TouchArcade rated the game 4.5 out of 5 stars. Metacritic gave the game a weighted average score of 84 out of 100, indicating "generally favorable reviews".

References 

2017 video games
IOS games
Side-scrolling platform games